Iodobenzamide (IBZM or iolopride) is a pharmaceutical drug used for diagnostic purposes. It is a dopamine antagonist and it can be used by nuclear medicine physicians as a radioactive tracer for SPECT where the radioactive isotope is iodine-123 or iodine-125. The main purpose of a brain study with IBZM is the differentiation of Parkinson's disease from other neurodegenerative diseases such as Lewy Body dementia and multiple system atrophy.

References

Radiopharmaceuticals
Benzamides
Iodoarenes
Phenols